Sarah Lynn Gadon (born April 4, 1987) is a Canadian actress. She began her acting career guest-starring in a number of television series, such as Are You Afraid of the Dark? (1999), Mutant X (2002), and Dark Oracle (2004). She also worked as a voice actress on various television productions. Gadon gained recognition for her roles in David Cronenberg's films A Dangerous Method (2011), Cosmopolis (2012), and Maps to the Stars (2014). She also starred in Denis Villeneuve's thriller Enemy (2013), the period drama Belle (2013), and the action horror film Dracula Untold (2014).

In 2015, Gadon co-starred in the supernatural thriller The 9th Life of Louis Drax and portrayed a young Elizabeth II in the comedy A Royal Night Out. The following year, she starred as Sadie Dunhill in the Hulu miniseries 11.22.63, an adaptation of Stephen King's novel 11/22/63. In 2017, Gadon played the lead role of Grace Marks in the CBC miniseries Alias Grace, which is based on the Margaret Atwood novel of the same name, and joined the cast of the Crave sitcom Letterkenny in its third season. The following year, she had a leading role in the period drama The Great Darkened Days. In 2019, Gadon starred in the third season of the HBO anthology series True Detective.

Gadon has received numerous accolades, including three Canadian Screen Awards for Alias Grace, Enemy, and The Great Darkened Days. In 2016, she earned the Award of Excellence by the Alliance of Canadian Cinema, Television, and Radio Artists (ACTRA).

Early life and education
Gadon was born in Toronto, Ontario, to a psychologist father and teacher mother. She has an older brother named James. Gadon has English and Italian ancestry. She spent much of her childhood and adolescence training and performing as a dancer, with time spent as a Junior Associate at The National Ballet School of Canada and as a student at the Claude Watson School for the Performing Arts. She graduated high school as an Ontario Scholar from Vaughan Road Academy in 2005. By 2014, she had completed her studies in the University of Toronto's Cinema Studies Institute at Innis College.

Career
Gadon started acting at the age of 11 with her first acting role as Julia in an episode of La Femme Nikita (1998). For the next few years, she took episodic roles in various television series, including Monica in Are You Afraid of the Dark? (1999), Young Laura Burnham in Twice in a Lifetime (2000), Catherine Hartman in Mutant X (2002), Claudia in Dark Oracle in 2004, Vicki in Life with Derek (2005), and Tasha Redford in Flashpoint (2008).

She also has a number of television films to her credit. She was nominated for the Young Artist Award for Best Ensemble in a TV movie for her first film, The Other Me (2000), portraying Heather. Other roles include Sarah in Phantom of the Megaplex (2000), Samantha in What Girls Learn (2001), Amanda in Cadet Kelly (2002), Julia Norton in Code Breakers (2005) and Celeste Mercier in The Cutting Edge: Chasing the Dream (2008). Gadon had recurring roles in many television series: Zoe Kessler in The Border (2008–2009), Katie Atkins in Being Erica (2009), Georgia Bravin in Happy Town (2010) and Ruby Odgen in Murdoch Mysteries (2009–2011). She is also behind the voice of the title character in the animated series Ruby Gloom (2006–2007), Beth in Total Drama (2007–2011) and Portia in Friends and Heroes (2007–2009). Gadon was nominated for a Gemini Award in 2008 for Best Individual or Ensemble Performance in an Animated Program or Series for her work in Ruby Gloom (2008).

In 2005, she filmed for Where Love Reigns, a promotional film co-starring Douglas Henshall.

Her filmography includes both feature length and short films. Her first feature film was Fast Food High (2003) where she portrayed Zoe. She portrayed Margaret in the dark comedy Siblings, Priscilla in Charlie Bartlett (2007) and Laura in Leslie, My Name is Evil (2009).

Her short film work includes Haley in Burgeon and Fade (2007), Julia in Grange Avenue (2008) and Gabrielle in Spoliation (2008). Burgeon and Fade won the Special Jury Award at the WorldFest Houston Festival for original dramatic short film. She also starred in the short indie film, The Origin of Teddy Bears, as Madison.

In 2011, Gadon starred in David Cronenberg's Cosmopolis, alongside Robert Pattinson, as his on-screen wife of 22 days, Elise Shifirin. She played Phillippa in the television adaptation of Ken Follett’s bestseller World Without End, an eight-hour event series. She featured in Brandon Cronenberg's debut feature, Antiviral as Hannah Geist, a mega-star in a sci-fi world where fans pay to be infected with the diseases of the rich and famous.

In 2012, she appeared as Carl Jung's wife Emma in the David Cronenberg film A Dangerous Method and in a Canadian short film, Yellow Fish, alongside J. Adam Brown. On May 23, 2012 in Cannes, Birks presented the first Birks Canadian Diamond award to Gadon and Emily Hampshire during Telefilm Canada's inaugural Tribute To Canadian Talent press event and reception.

She played Miss Elizabeth Murray in the 2013 release of the film Belle. She co-starred in Denis Villeneuve's Enemy (2013), based on the José Saramago book, The Double (2002), and in David Cronenberg's Maps to the Stars (2014), a dark comic look at Hollywood excess.

She participated in the CBC "Canada Reads" competition in March 2014. In September 2014, it was announced that she was cast in Miramax's supernatural thriller The 9th Life of Louis Drax, along with Jamie Dornan and Aaron Paul. The film was released in September 2016. Gadon played Dracula's wife Mirena (and briefly the modern-day Mina) in the historical action film Dracula Untold, released in October 2014.

Gadon made her directorial debut with an episode of Reelside, a documentary series, which focused on her collaborative relationship with photographer Caitlin Cronenberg; the episode premiered on The Movie Network in Canada June 4, 2015. In 2015, Gadon appeared as Princess Elizabeth in A Royal Night Out, a deeply fictionalized account of the future Queen's incognito night on the town, along with her sister Princess Margaret, on the evening of VE Day.

In 2016, Gadon starred opposite Logan Lerman in Indignation, an adaptation of Philip Roth's 2008 novel of the same title, and opposite James Franco in 11.22.63, a television mini-series version of Stephen King's novel of the same title. In 2017, Gadon played the lead role in the CBC miniseries Alias Grace, which is based on the Margaret Atwood novel of the same name. For her performance, she won her second Canadian Screen Award. 

In 2019, she starred in the third season of the HBO anthology series True Detective. She also co-starred with Hong Chau in the film American Woman directed by Semi Chellas. 

In 2021, she starred in the film All My Puny Sorrows with Alison Pill, as two Mennonite sisters who leave their religious lives behind. Gadon won Best Supporting Actress in a Canadian Film from the Vancouver Film Critics Circle Awards  for her role in the movie.

In September 2022, it was announced that Gadon has signed to direct her first feature film, an adaptation of Heather O'Neill's 2006 novel Lullabies for Little Criminals.

Personal life
Gadon was in a relationship with film editor and director Matthew Hannam. In a January 2019 joint interview, the pair explained that their shared experience of temporary stays in foreign cities was part of the inspiration for the short film Paseo, the first film in which Hannam directed Gadon.

She married her boyfriend Max Fine on September 24, 2022.

Filmography

Film

Television

Awards and nominations

Notes

References

External links

 
 
 
 

1987 births
Living people
Actresses from Toronto
Best Supporting Actress Genie and Canadian Screen Award winners
Canadian child actresses
Canadian expatriates in the United States
Canadian film actresses
Canadian people of English descent
Canadian people of Italian descent
Canadian television actresses
Canadian voice actresses
20th-century Canadian actresses
21st-century Canadian actresses